is a passenger railway station located in the city of Takamatsu, Kagawa, Japan.  It is operated by the private transportation company Takamatsu-Kotohira Electric Railroad (Kotoden) and is designated station "S08".

Lines
Yakuri Station is a station of the Kotoden Shido Line and is located 6.7 km from the opposing terminus of the line at Kawaramachi Station].

Layout
Yakuri Station features two side platforms serving two tracks. The station building is staffed, and is located to the north-west of the platforms. The platforms are connected by a level crossing.

Platforms

Adjacent stations

History
Yakuri Station opened on November 18, 1911 on the Tosan Electric Tramway. On November 1, 1943 it became a station on the Takamatsu-Kotohira Electric Railway.

Surrounding area
Yakuri-ji - 85th temple on the Shikoku pilgrimage
Takamatsu Municipal Tateishi Folklore Museum 
Isamu Noguchi Garden Museum

See also
 List of railway stations in Japan

References

External links

  

Stations of Takamatsu-Kotohira Electric Railroad
Railway stations in Japan opened in 1911
Railway stations in Takamatsu